The Bullom So language, also called Mmani, Mani, or Mandingi, is an endangered language currently spoken in a few villages in Samu region of Sierra Leone's Kambia District, near the border of Guinea. It belongs to the Mel branch of the Niger–Congo language family and is particularly closely related to the Bom language. Intermarriage between Bullom So speakers and speakers of Temne and Susu is common. As the few remaining speakers of Bullom So are all over 60, the language is considered moribund.

History 
According to Childs, the Mani once occupied an area far greater than where the language is spoken today. At the start of the 18th century, the Mani kingdom stretched from Sierra-Leone to Guinea. They were later replaced along the coastal region by Temne-Baga speakers, and later by the Soso, through war, invasion and acculturation.

Classification 
The Bullom So (Mani) language is a Niger-Congo language of Mel subgroup. It is closely related to Kisi, Sherbro, Kim and Bom.

Phonology

Prosody 
The most common syllable type in Bullom So (Mani) is CV and CVC. Nasals can also be syllabic, though they are relatively uncommon, much like V only syllables.

Vowels are nasalised when syllable codas contain nasals. Here are some examples from Childs (2011: 37):

Regressive Nasal Assimilation

 /wàm/ [wãm] or [wã] 'ten'
 /tún/ [tũ] 'commit'
 /bìn/ [bĩ] 'plank'
 /nyɛ̀n/ [nyɛ̃] 'mouth'

Grammar

Orthography

Written Mani before the Twenty-First Century 
Gustavus Reinhold Nyländer translated the Gospel of Matthew into Bullom So, and portions of the Bible were also included in his Book of Common Prayer.  These were published by the Church Missionary Society (CMS) in 1816.

Sample Texts in Nyländer's Orthography

The Lord's Prayer

Excerpt from "A Dialogue between a Christian Missionary and a Native of Bullom"

Written Mani in the Twenty-First Century

Sample Texts from the Mani Documentation Project

References

Literature
 Childs, G. Tucker (2011). A Grammar of Mani. (Mouton Grammar Library; 54.) Berlin; Boston: De Gruyter Mouton. 
 Childs, G. Tucker (2007). Hin som sɛk! oma si fɔ mfɔ mmani! (A Mani primer). Portland; OR: Real Estate Publishers, Inc.
 Moity, Marcel (1948). Étude sur la langue mmani (unpublished ms). Dakar: IFAN.
 Moity, Marcel (1957). Notes sure les mani (Guinée Française). Bulletin de l'Institut Français d'Afrique Noire 19:302-307. 
 Nyländer, Gustavus Reinhold. 1814. Grammar and Vocabulary of the Bullom Language. London: Christian Missionary Society.
 Pichl, Walter J. (1980). Mmani. In West African Language Data Sheets, vol. 2. M. E. Kropp Dakubu (ed.), 1–6. Accra and Leiden: West African Linguistic Society and African Studies Centre.

External links
 Select Portions of the Book of Common Prayer, according to the Use of the United Church of England and Ireland (1816), translated by Gustavus Reinhold Nyländer, digitized by Richard Mammana
 Mani Documentation Project (2004-2006), Documenting the moribund language Mani, a Southern Atlantic language of Niger-Congo

Bullom languages
Languages of Sierra Leone
Endangered languages of Africa